Football Club Copenhagen, commonly known as FC København, FC Copenhagen, Copenhagen or simply FCK, is a professional Danish football club in Copenhagen, Denmark.  FCK was founded in 1992 as a superstructure on top of Kjøbenhavns Boldklub and Boldklubben 1903. 

F.C. Copenhagen has won 14 Danish Football Championships and 8 Danish Cups. In European football F.C. Copenhagen has reached the group stage of the UEFA Champions League and the group stage of the UEFA Europa League more times than any other Danish club and are the only Danish club who has reached the knockout stage of the Champions League. As of December 2022, Copenhagen are the highest ranked Scandinavian club in the UEFA team rankings list.

Copenhagen plays its matches at the Parken Stadium, which also serves as the venue for Denmark national football team matches. Since their foundation, FCK have developed a fierce rivalry with Brøndby IF. The Copenhagen Derby games between the two sides have attracted some of the biggest crowds in Danish football history.

History

Early success
Football Club Copenhagen is, in many ways, both an old and a new club. Even though the club was established in 1992, it is rooted in more than 100 years of club tradition. The club's first team represents two separate clubs: Kjøbenhavns Boldklub (continental Europe's oldest football club) founded in 1876 and Boldklubben 1903 founded in 1903. Due to financial difficulties throughout the clubs in the Copenhagen area in the 1980s and Kjøbenhavns Boldklub's on the verge of bankruptcy, the two old Copenhagen clubs got together and established the superstructure which is FC København. Copenhagen used Boldklubben's club license to play in the Danish Superliga championship, while Kjøbenhavns Boldklub became the official reserve team of the club. With the rebuilding of the Parken Stadium, Denmark's national team stadium, the new club had a modern stadium to play at from the beginning. The initial ambition of the club was continually to qualify for one of the European competitions each season. To reach this goal, the club needed a solid economy, a relatively big fan base and an "attractive and positive style of football."

Benny Johansen managed the club and started its maiden season well. FCK made its first appearance in the European tournaments when it beat Swiss team Grasshoppers 2–1 in the 1992 UEFA Intertoto Cup. FCK won the Intertoto Cup that year and thereby qualified for the UEFA Cup, where it was eliminated in the second round by French team Auxerre. The club won the 1992–93 Superliga season one point ahead of Odense Boldklub and two points ahead of third-place Brøndby IF. For the 1993–94 Superliga season, expectations were high. The season opened with a 0–6 thrashing at the hands of Italian team Milan in the 1993–94 Champions League qualification. FCK went on winter break after the first half of the Superliga season in third place. In the spring of 1994, Copenhagen gained on leading team Silkeborg IF. In the penultimate match of the season, the two teams met at the Parken Stadium. In front of a record-setting attendance of 26,679, FCK won the match 4–1. The club was one point ahead of Silkeborg, but because FCK lost 3–2 to Odense in the final game of the season, it had to settle for second place.

Years of underachievement
For the next three seasons, Copenhagen had little success in the Superliga, despite winning two Danish Cups. The team won the 1995 Cup final against Akademisk Boldklub with a 5–0 win, qualifying for European football once again, despite mediocre results in the league. Kim Brink took over as manager in 1996, but despite winning the second Cup trophy for the club, the eighth-place finish in the 1996–97 Superliga season prompted another change in managers.

Flemming Østergaard joins the board
In February 1997, Flemming Østergaard, later given the nickname "Don Ø," joined the board of the club as vice chairman and CEO. After a successful IPO, generating DKK 75 million, FCK was introduced on the Copenhagen Stock Exchange in November 1997. The 1997–98 season marked the first season that Copenhagen averaged more than 10,000 spectators at home, and the club bought their stadium Parken for DKK 138 million in June 1998. The self-acclaimed "best manager in Denmark," Christian Andersen, began managing the club in January 1999. After 75 controversial days, however, he was fired in March 1999; Sports Director Niels-Christian Holmstrøm explained Andersen had created frustration among the players.

In 1999, Copenhagen made its impact in Europe when it faced English side Chelsea in the second round UEFA Cup Winners' Cup. In the first leg away at Stamford Bridge, Bjarne Goldbæk gave Copenhagen the lead nine minutes before the end of the match, but Chelsea scored in the last minute of the game. Chelsea later won the second game at Parken with a goal by the Dane Brian Laudrup, knocking out FCK. At the post-match press conference, it was announced that Chelsea's Brian Laudrup was signing with Copenhagen in January 1999, with Bjarne Goldbæk moving in the other direction for Chelsea. A four-time Danish Player of the Year award winner, Laudrup, however, could not help Copenhagen improve their league position, and the club ended the year in seventh in the 1998–99 Superliga season. Laudrup only stayed for just six months at the club before signing for Ajax at the end of the season. In the 1999–2000 season, F.C. Copenhagen struggled to make any significant impact and finished eighth in the league.

Champions again
In the winter 2000 transfer window, South African striker Sibusiso Zuma was signed from South African side Orlando Pirates, and in May 2000, English manager Roy Hodgson became the new manager. From the 2000–01 season, the club started to improve. The club won its second Superliga championship, winning 3–1 in the last Copenhagen Derby match of the season, at the Parken Stadium. The 2–0 goal was a bicycle kick by Zuma, who received the ball at his chest, bounced it in the air and in the same motion executed the overhead kick, volleying the ball into the far corner out of Brøndby goalkeeper Mogens Krogh's reach. This was later voted the Danish goal of the year, and was voted the best Superliga goal of the decade in December 2009 and was in 2013 voted as the greatest moment in the history of FCK. Roy Hodgson broke his contract with Copenhagen a few weeks after having won the championship, signing with Italian team Udinese, and he was replaced by Swede Kent Karlsson. The 2001 season is also remembered for a highly dramatic event. During training on 13 March 2001 charismatic midfielder Ståle Solbakken suffered a heart attack. He was rapidly attended to by club doctor Frank Odgaard who found that his heart had stopped beating and started to administer cardiac massage. Upon the ambulance's arrival, Solbakken was pronounced clinically dead at the scene, but on the way to the hospital in the ambulance he was revived nearly seven minutes later. He survived the episode and had a pacemaker fitted. Shortly after, on medical advice, he announced his playing retirement, but would later return to the club and become its most successful manager.

Copenhagen faced Italian team Lazio for qualification to the 2001–02 Champions League qualification. A 2–1 win for FCK in the first game proved moot, as Lazio ultimately progressed with a 5–3 aggregate score. Copenhagen thus entered the 2001–02 UEFA Cup, where it defeated Dutch giants Ajax 1–0 on a goal from left back Niclas Jensen. In the next round, however, German team Borussia Dortmund eliminated Copenhagen. The 2001–02 Superliga season also ended in disappointment for København, as Brøndby won the championship on goal difference after FCK had caught up with Brøndby's ten-point lead after the first half of the season. In the second-last round of the 2002–03 Superliga season, FCK faced Brøndby at Brøndby Stadium. In extra time, Hjalte Nørregaard scored his first goal for Copenhagen and brought the championship back to Parken.

In the Champions League second qualifying round in 2004–05, FCK won the first match against Slovenian club ND Gorica 2–1, but later lost at Parken 0–5. Under Backe, Copenhagen went on to win the 2004 and 2006 Danish championships and the 2004 Danish Cup. Copenhagen also won the inaugural 2004–05 edition of the Royal League tournament, beating Swedish team IFK Göteborg on penalty shootout in the 2005 final. Copenhagen repeated the achievement in the 2006 edition of the tournament, this time beating Norwegian team Lillestrøm SK 1–0 in the 2006 final. Backe became the longest-serving coach for FCK before leaving the club in December 2005. Former Copenhagen player Ståle Solbakken took over as manager.

European ambitions
For the 2006–07 season, Danish national team player Jesper Grønkjær reinforced Copenhagen. FCK looked forward to the 2006–07 Champions League qualifiers, where it beat Ajax. For the first time in the club's history, FCK entered the group stage of the Champions League, being grouped with Celtic, Benfica and Manchester United, all former winners of the trophy. Despite not losing a game at Parken (Benfica 0–0, Manchester United 1–0 and Celtic 3–1), FCK failed to qualify from the Champions League group stage after losing all of its away games. On 9 May, Copenhagen defeated Brøndby 1–0 and won its fifth Danish championship in seven years with four games to spare in the league.

In the 2007–08 season, Copenhagen lost the third qualification round of the Champions League with a 1–3 aggregate score to Benfica. After beating Lens 3–2, FCK qualified for the group stages of the 2007–08 UEFA Cup, where it played Panathinaikos (H), Lokomotiv Moscow (A), Atlético Madrid (H) and Aberdeen. Copenhagen fell to Panathinaikos and Atlético, but a win against Lokomotiv meant that the club needed only a draw against Aberdeen to qualify for the next round. However, a 0–4 defeat to Aberdeen put them out of the tournament. In the 2007–08 Superliga season, Copenhagen finished third, with AaB taking the title.

In the 2008–09 season, Copenhagen began strong. The team qualified for the 2008–09 UEFA Cup group stage by eliminating Northern Ireland club Cliftonville, Lillestrøm and FC Moscow. In the group, FCK lost at home to Saint-Étienne and drew 1–1 against Valencia. With a 1–1 draw against Rosenborg and a win over Club Brugge, Copenhagen qualified for the knockout phase of the competition, where it drew 2–2 in the first leg of the round of 32 against Manchester City on 19 February 2009. The club lost 1–2 in the second leg, a loss that ended its European season. In the domestic league, FCK battled for first place with Brøndby and Odense. Eventually, Copenhagen won the Cup final against AaB and claimed the league title with one game to spare in the tournament, thus securing the Double for the second time in the club's history. 2010 proved to be yet another European success. Even though the team lost the 2009–10 Champions League playoff match to APOEL with a 2–3 aggregate loss, the team had already qualified to the 2009–10 Europa League group stage by eliminating FK Mogren and Stabæk. Copenhagen lost away to CFR Cluj, won 1–0 at home against Sparta Prague, 0–1 away loss against PSV and by beating Cluj at home 2–0 and 3–0 away over Sparta, Copenhagen qualified for the round of 32 to face Marseille. The match-up, however, resulted in two 1–3 losses for Copenhagen, thus eliminating them from the competition.

The team's qualification to the 2010–11 Champions League was secured after it beating BATE Borisov (0–0 / 3–2) and Rosenborg (1–2 / 1–0). The team thus entered the group stage in Group D and met Barcelona, Panathinaikos and Rubin Kazan. After a 3–1 win against Panathinaikos in their last group stage match, they qualified for the round of 16—thereby becoming the first-ever Danish club to reach the stage in the Champions League—where Chelsea defeated them.

Solbakken returns
Copenhagen won the 2012–13 Danish Superliga to secure a direct place in the group stage of the 2013–14 Champions League. However, after a horrific start to the 2013–14 Danish Superliga season, FCK fired manager Ariël Jacobs, rehiring Ståle Solbakken as his replacement. Solbakken was given a two-year contract with the option for a further two-year extension. In the Champions League, the club was placed into Group B alongside Real Madrid, Juventus and Galatasaray. FCK secured four points by drawing 1–1 against Juventus at home and winning 1–0 at home over Galatasaray after a great goal by Daniel Braaten. The club, however, conceded its first-ever Champions League group stage home defeat after falling 0–2 to Real Madrid in the last round of the group stage.

Copenhagen finished the 2013–14 league in second place, despite having been situated third for numerous weeks. A 3–2 away win against FC Midtjylland saw them closing in on the second place. In the last round of the league, FCK beat Odense Boldklub 3–2 at home whilst Midtjylland lost their game 3–1, ensuring Copenhagen's seizure of second place and its subsequent spot in the qualifying round of the 2014–15 Champions League.

After a busy summer transfer window with numerous new players arriving at the club, Copenhagen was drawn against Ukrainian outfit Dnipro Dnipropetrovsk in the third qualifying round of the 2014–15 Champions League. After an aggregate victory of 2–0 over Dnipro, Copenhagen was drawn against German club Bayer Leverkusen in the play-off round. The Germans, however, defeated Copenhagen 7–2 aggregate, dropping Copenhagen to contention in the 2014–15 Europa League.

FCK drew Italian club Torino, Club Brugge and Finnish side HJK Helsinki. Its campaign started well, securing a deserved 2–0 victory over HJK at home from two goals by Nicolai Jørgensen. Copenhagen's next two games were against Torino and Club Brugge respectively; it lost 1–0 against Torino and played to a 1–1 draw against Brugge after conceding a late goal in injury time in both matches. Copenhagen then failed to secure an important win against Brugge at home, a match they lost 0–4, setting up a must-win situation for FCK against HJK to progress to the round of 32. Copenhagen, however, failed—Macoumba Kandji managed to secure a 2–1 victory for HJK, their second win in the group, with another late goal. The result eliminated Copenhagen. The 2014–15 season ended with Copenhagen winning the Danish Cup and finishing second in the Superliga.

The 2015–16 season began with FCK bringing in six new players, most notably Danish international and former AaB player Kasper Kusk. By placing second in 2014–15, Copenhagen began in the second qualifying round of the 2015–16 UEFA Europa League, where they were drawn against Welsh club Newtown, defeating them 5–1 on aggregate to qualify them for the next round against Czech outfit Baumit Jablonec. The opening game of the 2015–16 Danish Superliga ended in a 2–1 away win for FCK against Esbjerg fB through goals from Marvin Pourié and Nicolai Jørgensen. Despite a 0–1 away win over Baumit Jablonec, Copenhagen lost its home game 2–3, resulting in a 3–3 aggregate loss on the away goals rule. This marked the first time in ten years that Copenhagen failed to qualify for either the Champions League or Europa League. On 5 May, the Danish Cup was won, after a 2–1 win Over AGF, with goals from Nicolai Jørgensen and William Kvist.

After winning the title the previous season, Copenhagen would compete in the 2016-17 Champions League qualifiers. In the playoff round they met APOEL FC, and was faced with the challenge on getting revenge after their tie against them in 2009. The first leg at Parken stadium ended 1–0 to the home team, and in the second leg, Copenhagen equalised in the 86th minute via Federico Santander's shot from a wide angle, qualifying for the group stage, with an aggregate score of 2–1. Copenhagen were subsequently placed in a group with Leicester City, FC Porto and Club Brügge. They would after 2 wins, 1 loss and 3 draws, finish 3rd in their group and move on to the 2016–17 Europa League Round of 32 where they met Ludogorats, whom they beat 2–1 on aggregate. In the round of 16, they met Ajax Amsterdam. In the first leg at home, Copenhagen won 2-1 after a first-minute goal from Rasmus Falk and a goal in the 59th minute by Andreas Cornelius. The away leg finished 2–0 to Ajax, and Copenhagen were knocked out of the tournament, with that seasons achievements in the Europa League being their best finish in the competition at the time. Domestically, the season was another season to enjoy for fans of the club. Copenhagen won the league with the closest competition, Brøndby, finishing 24 points behind them. At the time they were crowned champions, following a draw against FC Nordsjælland they were unbeaten in the league, with their first loss of the season coming against FC Midtjylland 2 rounds later, and subsequently another loss against Lyngby BK the round right after. Copenhagen also reached the cup final, where they met arch-rivals Brøndby. Copenhagen opened the scoring via Andreas Cornelius's first ever goal against the club, with Brøndby responding just 10 minutes later with an equaliser. Copenhagen secured the win with two goals in rapid succession, in the 83rd and 85th minutes, both long balls from defence to attack, scored by Santander and Cornelius respectively, thus resulting in the club from the capital winning their third consecutive cup final, along with their second consecutive domestic double.

In September 2019, the club announced that it would change its name in European competitions and would subsequently be known as F.C. Copenhagen with UEFA changing their abbreviation 'KOB' to 'CPH'.

Winning the 2018–19 Danish Superliga placed Copenhagen in the second qualifying round of the 2019–20 UEFA Champions League, beating Welsh outfit The New Saints. The following round against Red Star Belgrade ended 2–2 on aggregate, with Copenhagen pulling the shortest straw and going out in penalties, thus sending Copenhagen to the UEFA Europa League instead. Here Latvian team Riga were beaten 3–2 on aggregate thus securing qualification for the Group Stage. Copenhagen finishing second in Group B contested with FC Lugano, Dynamo Kyiv and Scandinavian rivals Malmö FF. Copenhagen were then drawn against Scottish outfit Celtic in the first knockout round of the UEFA Europa League. The first match in Telia Parken finished 1–1, whilst Copenhagen won the return leg 3–1 at Celtic Park. The opponent for the next round were the Turkish club Istanbul Başakşehir. The game ended 1–0 with Copenhagen falling to a late penalty converted by Edin Višća. The subsequent return match in Copenahagen was temporarily put on hold due to the COVID-19 pandemic. On 5 August 2020, Copenhagen won 3–0 over Istanbul Başakşehir to reach the quarter-finals for the first time in their history. In the quarter-finals, Copenhagen lost 0–1 to Manchester United with a penalty from Bruno Fernandes coming in after extra time.

After poor results in the beginning of the 2020-21 Danish Superliga, and failure to qualify for the 2020-21 Europa League, Ståle Solbakken was sacked by the club, and Hjalte Bo Nørregaard took over as caretaker manager, until Jess Thorup was appointed in November 2020.

Stadium

FCK owns its stadium, the national arena Parken Stadium. It was built in 1992, the same year the club was founded. Until the stadium opened (as Parken) in September 1992, the club played its first home matches at the smaller Østerbro Stadion, which is located adjacent to Parken. Parken has 38,065 seats, 4,000 fewer seats than the original capacity of 42,305.

Supporters
After 2000, the club has regularly attracted one of the highest attendances in Scandinavia. The official fan club, F.C. København Fan Club has more than 20,000 members. "FCKFC" was founded on 24 October 1991, approximately half a year before FCK played its first match. Furthermore, there are many unofficial "factions" connected to Copenhagen, the biggest being Urban Crew, Copenhagen Cooligans and Copenhagen Casuals. These are also reported to have friendships with factions from Hamburger SV, Rangers, IFK Helsinki and Helsingborgs IF. For the 2006–07 season, there were 23,795 spectators on average. For many years, the lower part of the "C-stand" at Parken, Nedre C, has been the main stand for the supporters of FCK. In 2006, a part of the lower "B-stand" was made a separate fan section for the fans who wanted to create more of an atmosphere and named Sektion 12. In general, most of FCK's supporters are from, and live, in the Copenhagen area, unlike their rivals, Brøndby IF, who have a reported 57% of their fanbase coming from Jutland. The area Sektion 12 on the lower "B-stand" grew so popular that the fans in a dialogue with the club made it bigger. That meant that the former family-area in the stadium in the other part of the "B-stand" got the whole new area called the "D-stand". The Sektion 12 area on the whole lower "B-stand" grew more and more popular which meant that the fans had a new dialogue with the club. That dialogue went well for the supporters and the club supported the suggestion of making the upper "B-stand" the second part of Sektion 12. Sektion 12 on the whole "B-stand" is now Northern Europe's biggest active stand.

Honours

National

 Danish Superliga
Winners (14): 1992–93, 2000–01, 2002–03, 2003–04, 2005–06, 2006–07, 2008–09, 2009–10, 2010–11, 2012–13, 2015–16, 2016–17, 2018–19, 2021–22
Runners-up (7): 1993–94, 2001–02, 2004–05, 2011–12, 2013–14, 2014–15, 2019–20
Danish Cup
Winners (8): 1994–95, 1996–97, 2003–04, 2008–09, 2011–12, 2014–15, 2015–16, 2016–17
Runners-up (4): 1997–98, 2001–02, 2006–07, 2013–14
Danish League Cup
Winners: 1996
Runners-up (2): 2005, 2006
Danish Super Cup
Winners (3): 1995, 2001, 2004
Ørestad Cup
Winners (2): 2000, 2002
The Atlantic Cup
Winners (1): 2014
Runners-up (2): 2020, 2022

Regional
Royal League
Winners (2): 2004–05, 2005–06
Runner-up: 2006–07

Copenhagen in European competitions

Copenhagen's first competitive European match was on 16 September 1992, in the 1992–93 UEFA Cup, beating MP 10–1 before losing to AJ Auxerre in the second round. In their first ever UEFA Champions League group stage match, they beat Manchester United 1–0 at home, via a goal in the 73rd minute by Marcus Allbäck.

Since then, the club has quickly become the most successful Danish team in European competition, reaching the group stage of the UEFA Champions League five times and advancing to the Round of 16 in 2010–11. They also reached the quarter-finals of the UEFA Europa League in 2019–20 which they lost to Manchester United 1–0 in extra time.

UEFA club coefficient ranking
As of 31 December 2022, Source: UEFA club coefficients

Players

Current squad

Out on loan

Reserves and youth teams 
See F.C. Copenhagen Reserves and Youth Team

Captains

FC Copenhagen All Stars
In 2014, 32,000 fans participated in a fan vote selecting their 11 all-time favourite Copenhagen players.

Staff

Current technical staff

Coaching history

There have been fifteen different coaches (permanent coaches and caretakers) of FC Copenhagen since 1992. One of the caretakers, Kim Brink, has coached the club during three separate tenures. The only non-Scandinavians to coach FCK are Roy Hodgson and Ariël Jacobs. The longest-running coach is Ståle Solbakken who has been in charge of FCK from 2006 to 2011 and from 2013 until 2020. Ståle Solbakken is also the most successful coach, in terms of winning percentage, with a winning percentage at 58.5%. Christian Andersen is FCK's least successful coach with a winning percentage at 0%. Andersen is also the shortest-running permanent coach of FCK as he only was in charge of FCK for just a single match before he was fired.

Records

All-time goal scorers in all official tournaments
1 Dame N'Doye 118 Goals (217 Games)
2 César Santin 84 Goals (220 Games)
3 Todi Jónsson 68 Goals (207 Games)
4 Lars Højer 66 Goals (214 Games)
5 Andreas Cornelius 63 Goals (184 Games)
6 Peter Møller 55 Goals (203 Games)
7 Sibusiso Zuma 53 Goals (188 Games)
8 Nicolai Jørgensen 52 Goals (146 Games)
9 Álvaro Santos 50 Goals (120 Games)
10 Federico Santander 48 Goals (112 Games)
11 Jonas Wind 46 Goals (114 Games)
12 Marcus Allbäck 45 Goals (120 Games)
13 David Nielsen 43 Goals (133 Games)
14 Morten Nordstrand 41 Goals (130 Games)
15 Martin Johansen 41 Goals (146 Games)
16 Ailton Almeida 37 Goals (139 Games)
17 Pieros Sotiriou 35 Goals (110 Games)
18 Hjalte Bo Nørregaard 34 Goals (320 Games)
19 Robert Skov 33 Goals (72 Games)

Most matches
Superliga: William Kvist (2005)  – 285
UEFA tournaments: William Kvist (2005) – 90
Overall: William Kvist (2005)  – 425

Most goals
Superliga: Dame N'Doye (2009) – 90
UEFA tournaments: Dame N'Doye (2009) – 21
Overall: Dame N'Doye (2009) – 118

Biggest victory in the Superliga
7–0 home against Odense Boldklub on 05 March 2023

Biggest defeat in the Superliga
0–5 away against Silkeborg on 17 April 1994
0–5 away against Brøndby on 16 May 2005
Biggest victory in European cups
7–0 home against Cliftonville on 31 July 2008 (UEFA Cup)

Biggest defeat in European cups
0–6 home against Milan on 20 October 1993 (Champions League)

Attendance record
41,201 spectators against Brøndby on 30 April 2006

Youngest and oldest player playing in the Superliga
Youngest player playing for Copenhagen: Roony Bardghji  – 16 years and 6 days against AGF on 21 November 2021
Oldest player playing for FC Copenhagen: Per Poulsen – 42 years and 125 days against Brøndby on 18 June 1995

Most Danish national championships won as player and manager
Player: William Kvist – 8
Manager: Ståle Solbakken – 8
(In brackets debut year)

Season results

Esports 
F.C. Copenhagen launched an esports division called North in 2017, with a Danish team in Counter-Strike: Global Offensive. The team had some success, making the playoffs of two Global Offensive Majors and winning DreamHack Masters Stockholm 2018. The team ceased operations in February 2021, citing financial difficulties brought on in part by the COVID-19 pandemic.

See also
Copenhagen Derby

Footnotes and references

Further reading
 Kurt Thyboe, "FCK – På evig jagt efter den umulige drøm" (FCK – On eternal hunt for the impossible dream), Denmark, 1999, 
 Kaare Johnsen and Jan Erik Hansen, "FC Krøniken" (The FC Chronicle), Denmark, 2001, 
 Flemming Østergaard and Lars Werge, "Don Ø", Denmark, 2002, 
 Christian Thye-Petersen and Kasper Steenbach, "Spillet om FCK" (The game for FCK), Denmark, 2002, 
 Jens Jam Rasmussen and Michael Rachlin, "Slaget om København" (Battle of Copenhagen), Denmark, 2005, 
 Flemming Østergaard, "Varmt hjerte, koldt blod" (Warm heart, cold blood), Denmark, 2005, 
 Magazine: "FCK Balls", Denmark, 2005–, ISSN 1901-1555

External links
Official website
FCKFC (official fanclub)  
Nipserstat (Web site containing statistical information about games played by FCK)  
UEFA Profile
FC Copenhagen: From pipe dream to European success

 
Copenhagen, F.C.
Copenhagen, F.C.
Publicly traded sports companies
1992 establishments in Denmark
Football clubs in Copenhagen